Barbara Ogier (baptized 17 February 1648 – 18 March 1720) was a Flemish playwright of De Olijftak, a chamber of rhetoric in Antwerp.
Her motto was "Deugd voeght yder" (Virtue is in order).

Life 

Barbara Ogier was the daughter of Maria Schoenmaeckers and Willem Ogier.
Her father was a playwright and, from 1660, also the factor (principal author) of the De Olijftak (the Olive Branch) chamber of rhetoric.
On 10 December 1680 she married the sculptor Willem Kerricx, who became prince of the Olijftak in 1692.
Their son Willem Ignatius was born on 22 April 1682.  He became a sculptor, painter and architect. He also wrote plays, as had his mother and grandfather, and in 1700 became factor of the Olijftak.

Ogier's Dood van Achilles (The Death of Achilles, 1680) was played before a farce by her father, played on the same day.
In the introduction to this play Ogier stresses that women have their own view of history, even on a matter like the siege of Troy.
In this case that was reasonable because the motive of the Trojan War was the abduction of a woman, Helen. 
The play was dedicated to Isabelle de Condé, wife of an Antwerp lawyer.

De Olijftak recognized Ogier's talent, and she was able to represent the chamber during the competition in Bruges in 1700.
She also represented De Olijftak on the occasion of great festivities such as the visit  to Antwerp in 1693 of the new governor general of the Spanish Netherlands, Maximilian Emanuel of Bavaria.
On this occasion, she wrote in two days a short play in which allegorical and mythological characters praise the elector and also describe the sad economic state of Antwerp after the closure of the mouth of the Scheldt.
The 360 lines of verse feature the allegorical figures of the Virgin of Antwerp, Apollo, Painting accompanied by three students and Sculpture with two students. 
The decor for the play was made by the painter Godefridus Maes, while the play was published by Godgaf Verhulst, illustrated with an engraving by Gaspar Bouttats.

Work

General 

Since they had less access to public life than men it was harder for women to print their works. 
Some opportunities were almost entirely reserved for men, such as chambers of rhetoric, societies that women could not join.
Barbara Ogier was an exception in many respects, since most of the female writers in the southern Netherlands were nuns or beguines who led a religious life in a convent or in a women's community.
However, the three tragedies she wrote were never printed, and were only partly transmitted. 
The poems we know by her are from anthologies of the De Olijftak chamber.

Reception 

Among those who held Barbara Ogier in high esteem during her life was Joseph Lamorlet, her colleague in the chamber of rhetoric, who in his Ontwaekte Poesie through the voice of Apollo called her Sappho, writing verse with no equal.
In 1724, in his Parnas, of de zang-godinnen van een schilder, Willem van Swaanenburg published a funeral poem in memory of Barbara Ogier.
According to Jan Frans Willems, the quality of her poetry was equal and perhaps superior to that of her father, Willem.
She herself apologized for the flaws of her style in the following verses:
{|class="wikitable"
|-
! Verse in Dutch
! Rough translation
|-
|
 Is myn Rymkonst vol ghebreken ?
 Tis door kortheydt van den tydt :
 'K wacht van Konstenaers gheen strydt.
 Wie sal vrouwen teghenspreken ?
|
My poetry, is it full of defects?
Lack of time is the cause:
I do not fear criticism by artists.
Who would dare to contradict a woman?
|}

List of works

Notes

Sources

Further reading 

1648 births
1720 deaths
Belgian women poets
Flemish writers (before 1830)
Flemish women
Writers from Antwerp